More Happy Than Not is the debut novel by American author Adam Silvera, published June 2, 2015 by Soho Teen.

The book is a New York Times best seller, was shortlisted for the Lambda Literary Award for Children's and Young Adult Literature, and has been included on many "best of" lists.

Plot 
Aaron Soto is a 16-year-old living in the Bronx with his mother and brother. His father died by suicide in the house three months ago. Aaron's ensuing depression caused him to attempt suicide as well, leaving him with a scar on his wrist in the shape of a smile. He maintains his happiness with his girlfriend Genevieve and his other friends in his project, promising himself to not make the same mistake again.

Aaron meets Thomas, a kid from a different project, and becomes friends with him due to his idealist and carefree personality. When Genevieve leaves for three weeks on an artist's retreat, their friendship deepens. Aaron suspects that Thomas is gay, and realizes that he had developed feelings for him as well. Aaron breaks up with Genevieve, and his old friends attack Thomas out of jealousy of Aaron's new friendship. Later that night he admits his feelings for Thomas, but he rejects him, telling him he's straight.

Distraught over losing his best friend, girlfriend, and old friends, Aaron turns to the Leteo Institute — an organization that uses neurosurgery to erase traumatic memories in their patients — to solve his problems. He figures that if he forgets that he is gay by erasing all his memories of Thomas, he'll have his old relationships back and be happy again. Before he does so, Thomas comes back and apologizes for reacting so harshly, though he states that he is straight and a romantic relationship between them isn't possible. Aaron's old friends overhear their conversation and physically assault Aaron for being gay.

A blow to his head from the attack causes his memories to be "unwound"; It is revealed that Aaron had already gone to the Leteo Institute before. He remembers memories that had been repressed: he secretly dated a classmate Collin while he was in a relationship with Genevieve. When he came out to his father, he kicked Aaron out of the house and slit his wrists in the bathtub. Aaron sought to confirm his relationship with Collin, but Collin drew back, due to his girlfriend getting pregnant. Devastated, Aaron decided to erase his memories of Collin so that he could be fully happy with his relationship with Genevieve.

Aaron recovers from the attack and the reappearance of the memories. He considers taking another Leteo procedure to forget the painful memories, but Thomas convinces him not to. Unfortunately, Aaron learns that he is developing anterograde amnesia as a side effect of the procedure. Before he fully loses his ability to create new memories, he sets out to gain closure in his relationships. He forgives Collin, Genevieve, and Thomas. Thomas pushes Aaron to focus on being "more happy than not" despite the hardships in his life. As Aaron waits for a cure to his amnesia, he promises to always try to find the happiness in the memories he remembers.

Reception 
More Happy Than Not is a New York Times best seller and a Junior Library Guild selection.

The book received starred reviews from Kirkus Reviews, School Library Journal, Publishers Weekly, and Booklist, as well as positive reviews from English Journal, The Bulletin of the Center for Children's Books, and The New York Times.

The New York Times's Gina Bellafonte applauded how Silvera "manages a delicate knitting of class politics through an ambitious narrative about sexual identity and connection that considers the heavy weight and constructive value of traumatic memory, as well."

Beyond popular media, More Happy Than Not has been discussed in academic journals, including English Journal, The Lancet,  Children's Literature, Oregon Library Association Quarterly, The Clearing House, and Research on Diversity in Youth Literature. It was also analyzed in two chapters from Engaging with Multicultural YA Literature in the Secondary Classroom.

References 

2010s LGBT novels
2015 LGBT-related literary works
American LGBT novels
Novels set in New York City
Soho Press books